The 1947–48 Colgate Red Raiders men's ice hockey season was the 24th season of play for the program but first under the oversight of the NCAA. The Red Raiders represented the Colgate University and were coached by J. Howard Starr, in his 13th season.

Season
At the start of the season, Colgate had to contend with the loss of its star goaltender as Mark Galloway accepted an invitation to try out for the US national team for the 1948 Olympics while on academic probation. While he was ultimately left off of the team, understudy Bill Taylor had to substitute in for the team's season-opening trip up to Buffalo. The three-game series was began with Colgate losing to Princeton, snapping a 16-game winning streak for the Raiders. The second game was against Dartmouth, widely regarded as the best team in the country. Colgate had an addition problem as goaltending equipment failed to arrive in time and necessitated Lou Reycroft taking a turn in goal. Despite the problems, Colgate put forth a credible performance and kept the game close until the final period. The team reversed the trend in the final game of the trip and downed Williams 5–0.

Though Galloway may have missed out, Tommy Dockrell and Bruce Gardner were both invited to join the AAU team that travelled to St. Moritz. They would miss several games for the Red Raiders, however, the travelling was all for naught as the AAU squad would not be allowed to participate as there was a conflict with the AHA team. In the meantime, Colgate won games over three other New York schools and put themselves into position for a possible, if unlikely, NCAA tournament bid.

After returning from the exam break, Colgate lost the services of Herb Muther to graduation but saw Dockrell and Gardner return while Galloway was off of probation and now eligible to play once more. Colgate evened the season series with Princeton, however, they had the same trick inflicted upon them by Clarkson. After the loss, Colgate headed over to Ithaca and swamped Cornell, perhaps venting some of their frustration on the hapless Reds. After defeating Norwich in the final game of the regular season, Colgate was invited to participate at the AAU tournament in Buffalo. The Raiders ended up defeating three amateur clubs over a 25-hour span to win the championship.

Roster

Standings

Schedule and results

|-
!colspan=12 style=";" | Regular Season

|-
!colspan=12 style=";" | National AAU Tournament

Note: The two games against the Clinton Hockey Club appear in the school's records, however, they are not mentioned in contemporary accounts. Additionally, the AAU tournament games are missing from Colgate's records.

Scoring statistics

Note: Colgate reported its players scoring 1 more goal than the team had for the season. Only scoring from the regular season are included.

References

Colgate Raiders men's ice hockey seasons
Colgate
Colgate
Colgate